Mary Ruefle (born 1952) is an American poet, essayist, and professor. She has published many collections of poetry, the most recent of which, Dunce (Wave Books, 2019), was longlisted for the National Book Award in Poetry and was a finalist for the 2020 Pulitzer Prize. Ruefle's debut collection of prose, The Most Of It, appeared in 2008 and her collected lectures, Madness, Rack, and Honey, was published in August 2012, both published by Wave Books. She has also published a book of erasures, A Little White Shadow (2006).

She has been widely published in magazines and journals including The American Poetry Review, Verse Daily, The Believer, Harper's Magazine, and The Kenyon Review, and in such anthologies as Best American Poetry, Great American Prose Poems (2003), American Alphabets: 25 Contemporary Poets (2006), and The Next American Essay (2002).

The daughter of a military officer, Ruefle was born in McKeesport, Pennsylvania in 1952, but spent her early years traveling around the U.S. and Europe. She graduated from Bennington College in 1974 with a degree in Literature. She currently teaches at the Vermont College of Fine Arts. In 2011, she served as the prestigious Bedell Distinguished Visiting Professor at the University of Iowa's Nonfiction Writing Program. In 2019, she was named poet laureate of the state of Vermont.

Awards and honors
 1984 National Endowment for the Arts fellowship.
 1995 Whiting Award
 1998 Award in Literature from the American Academy of Arts and Letters
 1999 Frost Place residency
 2002 Guggenheim fellowship in poetry
 2007 Lannan Foundation residency 
 2011 William Carlos Williams Award for Selected Poems
 2012 National Book Critics Circle Award finalist in Criticism for Madness, Rack, and Honey
 2014 Robert Creeley Award

Published works
Full-length poetry collections
Dunce (Wave Books, 2019)

  
  
 Trances of the Blast (Wave Books, 2013) 
 Selected Poems, 2010 (William Carlos Williams Award, 2011)
 
 Indeed I Was Pleased with the World (Carnegie Mellon University Press, 2007)
 A Little White Shadow (Wave Books, 2006)
 Tristimania (Carnegie Mellon University Press, 2004)
 Apparition Hill (CavanKerry Press, 2002)
 Among the Musk Ox People (Carnegie Mellon University Press, 2002)
 Post Meridian (Carnegie Mellon University Press, 1999)
 Cold Pluto (Carnegie Mellon University Press, 1996; Classic Contemporary version 2001)
 The Adamant (Carnegie Mellon University Press, 1989)
 Life Without Speaking (University of Alabama Press, 1987)
 Memling's Veil (University of Alabama Press, 1982)
 
Prose collections
 My Private Property Wave Books, 2016)
 The Most of It (Wave Books, 2008)

Non-fiction
 Madness, Rack, and Honey Collected Lectures (Wave Books, 2012)

Essays
 (Online Edition Only)

Erasure
 An Incarnation of the Now (See Double Press, 2015)

References

External links
 Library of Congress Online Catalog: Mary Ruefle
 Academy of American Poets: Mary Ruefle Bio
 Ploughshares Authors: Mary Ruefle
 Poetry Foundation: Mary Ruefle
 The Writer's Almanac with Garrison Keillor> A Certain Swirl, writersalmanac.publicradio.org  
 Verse Daily > Mary Ruefle: Speak, Zero, versedaily.org
 Review by Kathleen Rooney of The Most of It (March/April 2009), bostonreview.net
 Review of Apparition Hill, constantcritic.com
 Mary Ruefle: Ballad, poolpoetry.com
 Video: UC - Berkeley Webcast: Mary Ruefle > Lunch Poems, berkeley.edu 
 Video: UCTV - Mary Ruefle: ''Lunch Poems", uctv.tv
 Mary Ruefle: The Bench, harpers.org

1952 births
Date of birth missing (living people)
Living people
American essayists
American women poets
American women essayists
Bennington College alumni
Iowa Writers' Workshop faculty
National Endowment for the Arts Fellows
People from Bennington, Vermont
People from McKeesport, Pennsylvania
Poets Laureate of Vermont
Vermont College of Fine Arts faculty
Writers from Pittsburgh
American women academics